Apjohnia is a genus of green algae in the family Siphonocladaceae.

The genus name of Apjohnia is in honour of Anne Apjohn, the wife of James Apjohn (1796–1886), the Irish chemist.

Species
As accepted by WoRMS;
 Apjohnia laetevirens 
 Apjohnia scoparia  

Former species;
 A. rugulosa  now accepted as synonym of Cladophora prolifera 
 A. tropica  accepted as synonym of Siphonocladus tropicus

References

External links

Cladophorales genera
Siphonocladaceae